Kim Ji-mee (born July 15, 1940) is a South Korean actress, producer, and film planner whose activity began in 1957. She was born in Daedeok, South Chungcheong province, Korea in 1940. While a student of Deokseong Girls' High School, Kim was cast to Kim Ki-young's film, Hwanghon yeolcha (황혼열차) in 1957. Kim has been commonly dubbed "Elizabeth Taylor of Korea" by the South Korean news media for her resemblance with the American actress' appearance and popularity as well as her many marriages and divorces.

Filmography
*Note; the whole list is referenced.

Awards
 1965, the 3rd Blue Dragon Film Awards : Favorite Actress
 1966, the 4th Blue Dragon Film Awards : Favorite Actress
 1967, the 5th Blue Dragon Film Awards : Favorite Actress
 1969, the 5th Baeksang Arts Awards : Best Film Acting (대원군)
 1970, the 6th Baeksang Arts Awards : Favorite Film Actress selected by readers
 1970, the 7th Blue Dragon Film Awards : Best Actress (너의 이름은 여자)
 1971, the 7th Baeksang Arts Awards : Favorite Film Actress selected by readers
 1971, the 8th Blue Dragon Film Awards : Favorite Actress
 1972, the 8th Baeksang Arts Awards : Favorite Film Actress selected by readers
 1972, the 9th Blue Dragon Film Awards : Favorite Actress
 1973, the 9th Baeksang Arts Awards : Favorite Film Actress selected by readers
 1974, the 10th Baeksang Arts Awards : Best Film Acting (잡초)
 1974, the 10th Baeksang Arts Awards : Favorite Film Actress selected by readers
 1974, the 13th Grand Bell Awards : Best Actress (토지)
 1975, the 14th Grand Bell Awards : Best Actress (육체의 약속)
 1985, the 24th Grand Bell Awards : Best Actress (길소뜸)
 1987, the 23rd Baeksang Arts Awards : Best Film Acting (티켓)
 1987, the 7th Korean Association of Film Critics Awards : Best Actress (티켓)
 1990, the 28th Grand Bell Awards : Best Supporting Actress (추억의 이름으로)
 1991, the 15th Golden Cinematography Awards : Favorite Actress
 1992, the 30th Grand Bell Awards : Planning Award (명자 아끼꼬 쏘냐)
 2000, the 37th Grand Bell Awards : Film Development Lifetime Achievement
 2000, the 20th Korean Association of Film Critics Awards : Lifetime Achievement (전 영화인협회 이사장)

References

External links

1940 births
Living people
South Korean film actresses
Best Actress Paeksang Arts Award (film) winners